Sean Joseph Baker (born November 6, 1988) is a former American football safety and current coach who is the assistant special teams coordinator for the Houston Texans of the National Football League (NFL). He signed with the Tampa Bay Buccaneers in 2012 as an undrafted free agent, and has also been a member of the Atlanta Falcons and Indianapolis Colts.

High school career
Attending Canfield High School, Baker helped team to an 8-3 overall record as a senior and a 29-8 mark in his career. He tallied 90 tackles and two interceptions.

Considered only a two-star recruit by Rivals.com, Baker was not ranked among the nation's top defensive backs. He committed to Ball State on December 27, 2006, picking the Cardinals over Eastern Michigan and Kent State.

College career
After redshirting his first year at Ball State, Baker played in all 14 games in 2008 and started the final 10 to earn his first letter. He led the Cardinals with 91 tackles and tied for the Mid-American Conference lead with six interceptions, including one he returned for a touchdown against Indiana, and had 10 pass breakups.

Baker subsequently earned multiple All-Freshman honors, as he was named to FWAA′s Freshman All-America team, Sporting News′ Freshman All-American team, and Rivals.com′s Freshman All-America team.

Professional career

Tampa Bay Buccaneers
Baker entered the 2012 NFL Draft, but was not selected. He signed with the Tampa Bay Buccaneers following the draft, on May 7, 2012. In his fourth NFL preseason game, Baker made two interceptions and a fumble recovery. Despite his performance in the game, Baker was released by the Buccaneers on August 31. On November 27, 2012, Baker was signed to the Buccaneers practice squad.

Atlanta Falcons
On October 22, 2013, Baker was signed to Atlanta Falcons practice squad. After being cut by the Falcons on August 30, 2014, he was re-signed to the regular season and promoted to the active roster. Baker played in five games for the Falcons in 2014 and was credited for two tackles. On September 4, 2015, he was cut by the Falcons.

Indianapolis Colts
On October 29, 2015, the Indianapolis Colts signed Baker to their practice squad. He was released on October 31.

Cleveland Browns
On January 5, 2016, Baker signed a reserve/futures contract with the Cleveland Browns. His contract was for 1-year and $525,000. On August 29, 2016, Baker was waived by the Browns.

Coaching career
Baker was hired by Youngstown State as a defensive quality control coach in 2017. He was promoted to special teams coordinator and outside linebackers coach by 2020.

Baker was hired by the Houston Texans as their assistant special teams coordinator on March 10, 2021.

References

External links
 Tampa Bay Buccaneers bio
 Ball State Cardinals bio

1988 births
Living people
American football safeties
Ball State Cardinals football players
Tampa Bay Buccaneers players
Atlanta Falcons players
Indianapolis Colts players
Cleveland Browns players
Youngstown State Penguins football coaches
Houston Texans coaches
Players of American football from Youngstown, Ohio